Noosa is a Legislative Assembly of Queensland electoral district in the Australian state of Queensland. The electorate is centred on Noosa and stretches northwest to the southern border of Gympie, south to Peregian Springs and west to Eumundi.

The electorate was formed in 1992 following the redistribution of the Electoral district of Cooroora.

The seat is currently held by Sandy Bolton, an independent.

Members for Noosa

Election results

References

External links
 

Noosa
Sunshine Coast, Queensland